Syed Faisal Bukhari (born August 9, 1963) is a Pakistani film and television director, producer, and cinematographer. He is a son of the late legendary Pakistani film playback singer Zubaida Khanum and the late film cameraman Syed Riaz Bukhari. Faisal Bukhari lives in Lahore, Pakistan.

Filmography

Films

Television

References

External links
 http://cineplot.com/lollywood-mona-liza-to-make-lollywood-debut/, Pakistani lead film actress talks about Syed Faisal Bukhari's film Saltanat (2014) on cineplot.com website, Retrieved 9 Sep 2016

Pakistani film directors
Pakistani screenwriters
Pakistani cinematographers
1963 births
Living people